The 143rd Georgia General Assembly met for two sessions between January 9, 1995, and January 13, 1997.

Officers

Senate

Presiding Officer

Majority leadership

Minority leadership

House of Representatives

Presiding Officer

Majority leadership

Minority Leadership

Members of the Georgia State Senate, 1995–1996
The following is a list of senators who served during the first session in 1995.

Members of the Georgia State House of Representatives, 1995–1996
The following is a list of representatives who served during the first session in 1995.

References

Georgia (U.S. state) legislative sessions
1995 in American politics
1996 in American politics
1995 in Georgia (U.S. state)
1996 in Georgia (U.S. state)